Mamta Singhal MBE BEng MSc MBA CEng FIET FWES is a design engineer and an active campaigner on diversity in engineering. In 2022 she was awarded an MBE in the New Years Honours for services to engineering. In 2007, she was awarded the Women's Engineering Society Prize for engaging and inspiring young people's interest in STEM.

Early life and education 
Singhal was born in Massachusetts and grew up in South Lanarkshire, Scotland.

Career 
Singhal joined Dyson on a graduate engineering program in 2003 and later moved to Hasbro as a Global Design Engineer from 2003–2006. She spent four years working on international projects for Hasbro including Playdoh, Monopoly and Action Man. She joined Mars as a Senior Scientist and Project Packaging Manager in 2009, working on brands such as Galaxy, Twix, Bounty and M&Ms. Between 2011 and 2013, Singhal worked as a Senior Innovation Executive at Scottish Enterprise, before joining Mattel as a Project Quality Engineer in 2013. Singhal worked as Commercialisation Manager at Coca-Cola European Partners. from 2017-2021 and currently works for Diageo plc.

Singhal is a regular speaker on diversity in engineering and encouraging young people consider STEM careers. In 2016 and 2019 she was a speaker and mentor at Management Today's Inspiring Woman in Business Conference for STEM and in 2018 she chaired the panel for the IET Young Woman Engineer of the Year awards. She also appeared in the IET's 'Portrait of an Engineer' campaign in 2017.

In 2020 Singhal became an engineering visiting professor at Middlesex University and was elected as a Fellow of the Women's Engineering Society. She was elected to the Board of the Women's Engineering Society in October 2021.

Singhal was appointed as a member of the Institution of Engineering and Technology's Council for 2019–2022 and was granted Fellowship of the IET in October 2021. She was appointed as a Member of the Order of the British Empire in the 2022 New Year's Honours List for services to engineering.

Awards 

2022: Member of the British Empire, New Years' Honours
2021: Fellowship of the Institution of Engineering and Technology
2020: Fellowship of the Women's Engineering Society
2020: Visiting Professorship at Middlesex University
2015: BDO's British Indian Awards Best in Science & Engineering
2015: ToyNews Women of the Year (finalist)
2014: UK Women of the Future – Professional, contribution to engineering (finalist)
2008: AMBA MBA Student of the Year (finalist)
2008: UK Woman of the Future – Woman in Science and Technology (finalist)
2007: WES Prize
2007: Supernova – Greenest New Product Idea Winner

References

Further reading 
 Interview with Mamta Singhal in Management Today
 National Women in Engineering Day article from the Daily Telegraph 
 Glasgow City of Scientists: a collection of innovators
 BBC interview on gendered toys for children
 IET Portrait of an Engineer campaign

Living people
Alumni of the University of Glasgow
Alumni of the University of Strathclyde
Year of birth missing (living people)